Iosif Budahazi (25 May 1947 – 22 November 2003) was a Romanian fencer. He competed in the individual and team sabre events at the 1972 Summer Olympics.

References

1947 births
2003 deaths
Romanian sabre fencers
Romanian male fencers
Olympic fencers of Romania
Fencers at the 1972 Summer Olympics
People from Carei